La Purísima Concepción may refer to one of several Spanish missions, including the following:

Places
 Mission La Purísima Concepción in Lompoc, California
 Rancho La Purísima Concepción in Los Altos Hills, California
 Mission Puerto de Purísima Concepción near Yuma, Arizona
 Misión de la Purísima Concepción de Aquico in Hawikuh Ruins, New Mexico
 Mission Concepcion in San Antonio, Texas
 Purísima Concepción, Las Marías, Puerto Rico, a barrio
 Misión La Purísima Concepción de Cadegomó in Baja California Sur

Other uses
 Spanish ship Purísima Concepción (1779), A Spanish ship of the line

See also
 Concepción (disambiguation)
 Immaculate Conception (disambiguation), the English term
 La Purísima (disambiguation)
 Purísima